Augustine Kiprono Choge (born 21 January 1987) is a Kenyan middle distance and long distance runner.

He won world youth and junior titles on the track in 2003 and 2004, eventually going on to set a world junior record for the 3000 metres in 2005. In his final year as a junior he won the World Cross Country Junior title.

He claimed the 5000 metres gold medal at the 2006 Commonwealth Games, but began to focus more on the 1500 metres from then on. He reached the 1500 m finals at the 2008 Summer Olympics and the 2009 World Championships in Athletics. Choge broke the long-standing 4×1500 metres relay world record with a Kenyan team of runners in September 2009.

Career
Choge was born in 1987 to a family of small-scale farmers at Kipsigak, near Kapsabet in the Nandi District of Rift Valley Province, Kenya.

He won national secondary schools 10,000 metres in 2002. At the 2003 IAAF World Cross Country Championships he finished fourth in the Junior race and won gold medal as a part of the junior team. He competed at the 2003 East African Youth Championships in May in Addis Ababa and won three gold medals, in 800, 1500 and 3000 metres. At the 2003 World Youth Championships in Athletics he won the 3000 metres race. He holds the 3000 metres world junior record set in May 2005 in Doha, the previous record (7:30.67) was held by Kenenisa Bekele, set in 2001.

Choge graduated from Kabikwen Secondary School in 2004. At the 2004 World Junior Championships in Athletics he won 5000 metres race. At the 2004 IAAF World Athletics Final he was third in 5000 metres. At the 2005 IAAF World Cross Country Championships he won the junior race and junior team race. At the 2005 IAAF World Athletics Final he finished third in 3000 metres.

On 20 March 2006, he won the men's 5000 metres event at the 2006 Commonwealth Games with a time of 12 minutes, 56.41 seconds. This is the current Commonwealth Games record.

Augustine Choge competed at the 2008 Beijing Olympics and finished tenth in the 1500 m final. He came fifth over 1500 m on his debut at the 2009 World Championships in Athletics in August. In 2009 he was part of the Kenyan team that set a new the 4 x 1500 metres relay world record, 14:36.23 minutes. Other members of the team were William Biwott Tanui, Gideon Gathimba and Geoffrey Rono. The previous record in this rarely competed event was set by West Germany in 1977, making it the oldest world record when it was broken.

He ran the fastest qualifying time in the 3000 m at the 2010 IAAF World Indoor Championships, but failed to repeat his form in the final and finished in eleventh place. He took his first win of the 2010 IAAF Diamond League in the 1500 m at the Shanghai Golden Grand Prix and ended the year as second in the Diamond rankings behind Asbel Kiprop. The start of the 2011 season saw him move up to the fourth fastest runner of all-time over the 3000 m indoors, running a time of 7:28.00 minutes while event winner Yenew Alamirew became the world's third fastest man.

In October 2019, Choge joined the pacemaker team for the Ineos 1:59 Challenge to help fellow Kenyan athlete Eliud Kipchoge run a sub-two hour marathon distance.

Choge is managed by James Templeton and coached by Colm O'Connell.

Achievements

Personal bests

All information taken from World Athletics profile.

References

External links

IAAF - Focus on Athletes - Augustine Choge

1987 births
Living people
Kenyan male middle-distance runners
Kenyan male long-distance runners
Athletes (track and field) at the 2006 Commonwealth Games
Commonwealth Games gold medallists for Kenya
Athletes (track and field) at the 2008 Summer Olympics
Olympic athletes of Kenya
World record holders in athletics (track and field)
People from Nandi County
Commonwealth Games medallists in athletics
Kenyan male cross country runners
Medallists at the 2006 Commonwealth Games